Riding Mill is a village near Hexham in Northumberland, England. It is part of the civil parish of Broomhaugh and Riding. It is served by Riding Mill railway station and by a frequent bus service on the route from Hexham to Newcastle.

Riding Mill is notable as the location of Riding Mill pumping station. Up until here the water released from Kielder Water uses the River Tyne but at Riding Mill it is pumped to parts of Tyne and Wear and over the hills to Teesside.

Leaving the village towards Hexham, Hollin Hill Terrace is situated on the left. Very little information is available on these eight dwellings but they are an example of Victorian architecture. This terrace was not shown on maps of the area prior to 1850, but appear on a map dated between 1850/1894.

History
Mackenzie (1825) wrote — The Riding Mill is built upon a mountain brook called Dipton Burn – which it was often hazardous to pass, but in 1822 a good bridge was built across it. In recent times the road from the south coming into Riding Mill was a notorious traffic hazard because of the steep slope and the bends. A safety pit of small stones was constructed to halt vehicles that got out of control. The hill was also difficult to climb the other way, but a new road bypasses Riding Mill.

Styford
Directly north across the River Tyne is Styford Hall, the chief residence of the former township of Styford in Bywell St Andrew parish.

Governance
Riding Mill is in the parliamentary constituency of Hexham, Guy Opperman of the Conservative Party is the Member of Parliament.

Prior to Brexit, for the European Parliament its residents voted to elect MEP's for the North East England constituency.

For Local Government purposes it belongs to Northumberland County Council a unitary authority.

Landmarks
The corn mill existed in mediæval times and was granted to the monastery at Blanchland. It was a good source of profit because all the tenants had to bring their corn to be ground here and hand mills were forbidden by law. Since crossing the burn was difficult a pack horse bridge was constructed 1599-1600. In recent times the mill has been converted into a residence, but its appearance has been kept.

The large house opposite became the Wellington Hotel. It is a handsome structure and carries the date 1660 above the door. The letters are considered to be the initials of Thomas Errington and his wife Ann Carnaby. T.B. has come about by the Boultflour family living here; they were millers and probably altered the E into a B. The house gained some notoriety by its association with witchcraft. Anne Armstrong, the witch finder, lived at Birchesnook. In 1673 she accused Anne, wife of Thomas Baites of Morpeth, a tanner, of frequenting witches' meetings at Riding Bridge-end, where she danced with the devil. She also claimed to have seen Anne Forster of Stocksfield, Anne Dryden of Prudhoe and Lucy Thompson of Mickley, supping with theire proctector which they called their god in the Riding house. But the charges were dismissed at the Morpeth Quarter Sessions, the magistrates not being impressed with the evidence.

Other significant buildings include Oaklands Manor, Wentworth Grange, Underwood Hall, and former vicarage The Glebe.

Transport

Road
Riding Mill is linked to Newcastle and the A1 by the A695 which passes through the village.

Railway
The village is served by Riding Mill railway station on the Tyne Valley line. The line was opened in 1838, and links Newcastle with Carlisle in Cumbria. The line follows the course of the River Tyne through Northumberland.

Passenger services on the Tyne Valley Line are operated by Northern. The line is also heavily used for freight.

Public services
The only remaining village pub is 'The Wellington' as the two others have closed (The Railway and The Broomhaugh).

Sporting Clubs
Riding Mill Cricket Club have been established in the village since 1880 and currently compete in the Northumberland & Tyneside and West Tyne Senior Cricket Leagues.
Riding Mill FC formed in 2017 and compete in the Hexham & District Sunday Football League.
Riding Mill Tennis club is based on Millfield Road and is affiliated with the Northumberland Lawn Tennis Association and compete in the Northumberland & Durham tennis leagues.

Notable residents
Tom Graveney - England test cricketer
Robert Smith Surtees, Victorian novelist and founder of the hunting magazine "The Field" born at The Riding (cottage)
 Pam Waldron (OBE), Former Head of Operations, Health and Safety Executive Field Operations, Yorkshire and North East

References

External links

 Riding Mill Parish Council web site
 Broomhaugh First School web site
 Riding Mill Cricket Club Website
 Riding Mill Tennis Club website

Villages in Northumberland